Istrian Hound can refer to:

 Istrian Coarse-haired Hound
 Istrian Shorthaired Hound